Upa en apuros is a 1942  Argentine short animated colour film written and directed by Dante Quinterno.  The film premiered on November 20, 1942 at the Ambassador cinema in Buenos Aires.  At the 1943 Argentine Film Critics Association Awards,  Quinterno won the  Special Prize (Premio especial) for the film due to it being the first animated colour film in Argentine and Latin-American cinema.

It's an adaptation of the Argentine comic strip Patoruzú.

References

External links
 

1942 films
1940s Spanish-language films
Argentine black-and-white films
Argentine animated films
1942 animated films
Animated adventure films
Films based on Argentine comics
Animated films based on comics
1940s Argentine films